James Jesus Angleton (December 9, 1917 – May 11, 1987) was chief of counterintelligence for the Central Intelligence Agency (CIA) from 1954 to 1975. His official position within the organization was Associate Deputy Director of Operations for Counterintelligence (ADDOCI). Angleton was significantly involved in the US response to the purported KGB defectors Anatoliy Golitsyn and Yuri Nosenko. Angleton later became convinced the CIA harbored a high-ranking mole, and engaged in an intensive search. Whether this was a highly destructive witch hunt or appropriate caution vindicated by later moles remains a subject of intense historical debate.

According to  Director of Central Intelligence Richard Helms: "In his day, Jim was recognized as the dominant counterintelligence figure in the non-communist world." Investigative journalist Edward Jay Epstein agrees with the high regard in which Angleton was held by his colleagues in the intelligence business, and adds that Angleton earned the "trust ... of six CIA directors—including Gen. Walter Bedell Smith, Allen W. Dulles and Richard Helms. They kept Angleton in key positions and valued his work."

Early and personal life
James Jesus Angleton was born December 9, 1917, in Boise, Idaho, to James Hugh Angleton (1888–1973) and Carmen Mercedes Moreno (1898–1985). His parents met in Arizona while his father was a U.S. Army cavalry officer serving under General John Pershing. His father then joined the National Cash Register Corporation, rising through its ranks until in the early 1930s he purchased the NCR franchise in Italy, where he became head of the American Chamber of Commerce.

Angleton's boyhood was spent in Milan, Italy, where his family moved after his father bought NCR's Italian subsidiary. He then studied as a boarder at Malvern College in England before attending Yale University. The young Angleton was a poet and, as a Yale undergraduate, editor, with Reed Whittemore, of the Yale literary magazine Furioso, which published many of the best-known poets of the inter-war period, including William Carlos Williams, E. E. Cummings and Ezra Pound. He carried on an extensive correspondence with Pound, Cummings and T. S. Eliot, among others, and was particularly influenced by William Empson, author of Seven Types of Ambiguity. Angleton was trained in the New Criticism at Yale by Maynard Mack and others, chiefly Norman Holmes Pearson, a founder of American Studies, and briefly studied law at Harvard, but did not graduate.

He joined the U.S. Army in March 1943 and in July 1943 married Cicely Harriet d'Autremont, a Vassar alumna from Tucson, Arizona. Together, they had three children: James C. Angleton, Guru Sangat Kaur Khalsa (formerly Truffy Angleton), and Siri Hari Kaur Angleton-Khalsa (formerly Lucy d'Autremont Angleton). They lived in the Rock Spring neighborhood of Arlington, Virginia until Angleton's death in 1987. Angleton's wife and his daughters explored Sikhism. Both of Angleton's daughters became followers of Harbhajan Singh Khalsa.

World War II
During World War II Angleton served in the Office of Strategic Services (OSS) and led its branch in Italy. He served under Norman Holmes Pearson in the counter-intelligence branch (X-2) of the Office of Strategic Services in London, where he met the famous double agent Kim Philby. Angleton was chief of the Italy desk for X-2 in London by February 1944 and in November was transferred to Italy as commander of SCI [Secret Counterintelligence] Unit Z, which handled Ultra intelligence based on the British intercepts of German radio communications.

By the end of the war, he was head of X-2 for all of Italy. In this position Angleton helped Junio Valerio Borghese, whose elite unit Decima MAS had collaborated with the SS, escape execution. Angleton was interested in the defense of installations such as ports and bridges and offered Borghese a fair trial, in return for his collaboration. He dressed him up in an American uniform and drove him from Milan to Rome for interrogation by the Allies. Borghese was then tried and convicted of collaboration with the Nazi invaders but not of war crimes, by the Italian court.

Angleton remained in Italy after the war, establishing connections with other secret intelligence services and playing a major role in the victory of the US-supported Christian Democratic Party, over the USSR-supported Italian Communist Party in the 1948 Italian general election.

CIA career

Rise in influence in the CIA
Returning to Washington, he was employed by the various successor organizations to the OSS, eventually becoming one of the founder-officers of the Central Intelligence Agency in 1947. In May 1949, he was made head of Staff A of the CIA's Office of Special Operations, where he was responsible for the collection of foreign intelligence and liaison with the CIA's counterpart organizations. Beginning in 1951, Angleton was responsible for liaison with Israel's Mossad and Shin Bet agencies, "the Israeli desk", crucial relationships that he managed for the remainder of his career. During the next five years, Angleton helped put in place the structure of the new Agency and participated, to some extent, in the "Rollback" operations, associated with Frank Wisner in Albania, Poland and other countries, concerning all of which Angleton counseled caution and all of which failed. He worked particularly closely with Kim Philby, who being groomed to head the Secret Intelligence Service MI6, was also in Washington. The Angletons developed a varied social set in Washington, including professional acquaintances like the Philbys, poets, painters and journalists. In 1951, Philby's colleagues Guy Burgess and Donald Maclean defected to Moscow. Philby was expelled from Washington, suspected of having tipped them off to imminent exposure based on decoded Soviet communications from the Venona project.

Chief of the counterintelligence staff of the CIA
In 1954 Allen Dulles, who had recently become Director of Central Intelligence, named Angleton chief of the Counterintelligence Staff, a position that Angleton retained for the rest of his CIA career. Dulles also assigned Angleton responsibility for coordination with allied intelligence services. In general, Angleton's career at the CIA can be divided into three areas of responsibility: foreign intelligence activities, counterintelligence and domestic intelligence activities.

Under the heading of foreign intelligence, there was the Israeli desk, the "Lovestone Empire" and a variety of smaller operations. The Israeli connection was at first of interest to Angleton, for the information that could be obtained about the Soviet Union and aligned countries, from émigrés to Israel from those countries and for the utility of the Israeli foreign intelligence units, for proxy operations in third countries. Angleton's connections with the Israeli secret intelligence services were useful, for example, in obtaining from the Israeli Shin Bet a transcript of Nikita Khrushchev's 1956 speech to the Communist Party of the Soviet Union Congress denouncing Joseph Stalin. The Lovestone Empire is a term for the network run for the CIA by Jay Lovestone, once head of the Communist Party of the United States, later a trade union leader, who worked with foreign unions, using covert funds to construct a worldwide system of anti-communist unions. Finally, there were individual agents, especially in Italy, who reported to Angleton. It is quite possible that there were other foreign intelligence activities for which Angleton was responsible, for example, in Southeast Asia and in the Caribbean.

Angleton's primary responsibilities as chief of the counterintelligence staff of the CIA have given rise to a considerable literature focused on his efforts to identify any Soviet or Eastern Bloc agents, working in American secret intelligence agencies. As such agents have come to be called "moles", operations intended to find them have come to be called "Molehunts".

Three books dealing with Angleton take these matters as their central theme: Tom Mangold's Cold Warrior: James Jesus Angleton: The CIA's Master Spy Hunter, David C. Martin's Wilderness of Mirrors: Intrigue, Deception, and the Secrets that Destroyed Two of the Cold War's Most Important Agents and David Wise's Molehunt: The Secret Search for Traitors that Shattered the CIA. Tim Weiner's Legacy of Ashes: The History of the CIA paints Angleton as an incompetent alcoholic. These views have been challenged by Mark Riebling in Wedge: The Secret War between the FBI and CIA.

Angleton thought that all secret intelligence agencies should be assumed to be penetrated by others, or, at least, that a reasonable chief of counterintelligence should assume so. Angleton had direct experience of ways in which secret intelligence services could be penetrated. There was the manipulation of the German services in World War II by means of Ultra; there was the direct penetration of the British services by the Cambridge Five and their indirect penetration of the American services by means of the liaison activities of Kim Philby, Donald Maclean and perhaps others, and there were the highly successful efforts of the American secret intelligence services in regard to allied, hostile and Third World services. The combination of Angleton's close association with Philby and Philby's duplicity caused Angleton to double-check "potential problems". Philby was confirmed as a Soviet mole, when he eluded those sent to capture him and defected. Philby said that Angleton had been "a brilliant opponent" and a fascinating friend who seemed to be "catching on" before Philby's departure, thanks to CIA employee William King Harvey, a former Federal Bureau of Investigation agent, who had voiced his suspicions regarding Philby and others, who Angleton suspected were Soviet agents.

Angleton's position in the CIA, his close relationship with Richard Helms, in particular, his experience and character, made him particularly influential. As in all bureaucracies, this influence brought him the enmity of those who had different views. The conflict between the "Angletonians" and the "Anti-Angletonians" has played out in the public sphere generally in publications about the mole hunts and, in particular, in regard to two Soviet defectors (among many): Anatoliy Golitsyn and Yuri Nosenko.

Golitsyn and Nosenko

Although Golitsyn was a questionable source, Angleton accepted significant information obtained from his debriefing by the CIA. It is claimed that Golitsyn, in asking to defect rather than to become a double agent, implied that the CIA had already been seriously compromised by the KGB. Golitsyn may have concluded that the CIA failed to debrief him correctly because his debriefing was misdirected by a mole in the Soviet Russia Division, limiting his debriefing to a review of photographs of Soviet embassy staff to identify KGB officers and refusing to discuss KGB strategy. After Golitsyn raised this possibility with MI5 in a subsequent debriefing in Britain, MI5 raised the same concern with Angleton, who responded by requesting that DCI Richard Helms allow him to assume responsibility for Golitsyn and his further debriefing.

In 1964, Yuri Nosenko, a KGB officer working in Geneva, Switzerland, insisted that he needed to defect to the US, as his role as a double agent had been discovered, prompting his recall to Moscow. Nosenko was allowed to defect, although his credibility was immediately in question because the CIA was unable to verify a KGB recall order. Nosenko made two controversial claims: that Golitsyn was not a defector but a KGB plant, and that he had information on the assassination of President John F. Kennedy by way of the KGB's history with Lee Harvey Oswald during the time that Oswald lived in the Soviet Union.

Regarding the first claim, Golitsyn had said from the beginning that the KGB would try to plant other defectors in an effort to discredit him. Regarding the second, Nosenko told his debriefers that he had been personally responsible for handling Oswald's case and that the KGB had judged Oswald unfit for service due to his mental instability. Nosenko claimed that the KGB had not even attempted to debrief Oswald about his work on the U-2 spy plane during his service in the United States Marine Corps. Although other KGB sources corroborated Nosenko's story, he repeatedly failed lie detector tests. Judging the claim of not interrogating Oswald about the U-2 improbable, given Oswald's familiarity with the U-2 program, and faced with further challenges to Nosenko's credibility (he also falsely claimed to be a lieutenant colonel, a higher rank than he in fact held), Angleton did not object when David Murphy, then head of the Soviet Russia Division, ordered Nosenko held in solitary confinement for approximately three-and-a-half years.

Contrary to some accounts, the detention of Nosenko was neither ordered by Angleton nor kept secret. Without naming Nosenko, the 1975 report of the Rockefeller Commission, also known as the President's Commission on CIA Activities within the United States, affirmed that the CIA's Office of Security, which is responsible for the safety of defectors, the Attorney General, the Federal Bureau of Investigation (FBI), the United States Intelligence Board, and select members of Congress were all apprised of Nosenko's detention. Nosenko never changed his story. The "Monster Plot" report about Nosenko's detainment and handling, written by John Hart, was feared by him and CIA lawyers to be libelous due to including "literally irrelevant" information and "dramatic rhetorical phrases."

Suspicion of infiltration

Angleton became increasingly convinced that the CIA was compromised by the KGB. Golitsyn convinced him that the KGB had reorganized in 1958 and 1959 to consist mostly of a shell, incorporating only those agents whom the CIA and the FBI were recruiting, directed by a small cabal of puppet masters who doubled those agents to manipulate their Western counterparts. Hoover eventually curbed cooperation with the CIA, because Angleton refused to relent on this hypothesis. Angleton also came into increasing conflict with the rest of the CIA, particularly with the Directorate of Operations, over the efficacy of their intelligence-gathering efforts, which he questioned without explaining his broader views on KGB strategy and organization. DCI Helms was not willing to tolerate the resulting paralysis. Golitsyn, who was after all a major in the KGB and had defected years before, was able to marshal few facts to provide concrete support for his far-reaching theoretical views of the KGB. The senior leadership of the CIA came to this conclusion after a hearing in 1968 and Angleton was thereafter unable to draw directly upon Golitsyn.

In the period of the Vietnam War and Soviet-American détente, Angleton was convinced of the necessity of the war and believed that the strategic calculations underlying the resumption of relations with China were based on a deceptive KGB staging of the Sino-Soviet split. He went so far as to speculate that Henry Kissinger might be under KGB influence. During this period, Angleton's counter-intelligence staff undertook a most comprehensive domestic covert surveillance project (called Operation CHAOS) under the direction of President Lyndon Johnson. The prevailing belief at the time was that the anti-war and civil rights movements of the 1960s and 1970s had foreign funding and support. None was found by them, although the Soviet Union did influence the movements (see Soviet influence on the peace movement).

DCI William Colby reorganized the CIA in an effort to curb Angleton's influence, beginning by stripping him of control over the Israeli "account", which had the effect of weakening counter-intelligence. Colby then demanded Angleton's resignation. It has been claimed that Angleton directed CIA assistance to the Israeli nuclear weapons program.

Throughout the 1960s and 1970s Angleton privately accused various foreign leaders of being Soviet spies. He twice informed the Royal Canadian Mounted Police that he believed Prime Minister Lester Pearson and his successor Pierre Trudeau were agents of the Soviet Union. In 1964, under pressure from Angleton, the RCMP detained John Watkins, a close friend of Pearson and formerly Canadian Ambassador to the Soviet Union. Watkins died during interrogation by the RCMP and was subsequently cleared of suspicion. Angleton accused Swedish Prime Minister Olof Palme, West German Chancellor Willy Brandt and British Prime Minister Harold Wilson of using their access to NATO secrets to benefit the Soviet Union.

Attempted removal of Gough Whitlam
Australian journalist Brian Toohey claimed that Angleton considered then Australian Prime Minister Gough Whitlam a "serious threat" to the US and was concerned after the Commonwealth police raided ASIO headquarters in Melbourne in 1973 at the direction of Attorney General Lionel Murphy. In 1974, Angleton sought to instigate the removal of Whitlam from office by having CIA station chief in Canberra, John Walker, ask Peter Barbour, then head of ASIO, to make a false declaration that Whitlam had lied about the raid in Parliament. Barbour refused to make the statement.

Resignation

Seymour Hersh published a story in The New York Times about domestic counter-intelligence activities under Angleton's direction, against anti-war protesters and other domestic dissident organizations. Following this, Angleton's resignation was announced on Christmas Eve of 1974, just as President Gerald Ford demanded that Colby report on the allegations and as various Congressional committees announced that they would launch their own inquiries. Angleton told reporters from United Press International that he was quitting after 31 years because "my usefulness has ended" and the CIA was getting involved in "police state activities." Three of Angleton's senior aides in counter-intelligence—his deputy Raymond Rocca, executive officer of the counter-intelligence division William J. Hood, and Angleton's chief of operations Newton S. Miller—were coaxed into retirement within a week of Angleton's resignation after it was made clear that they would be transferred elsewhere in the agency rather than promoted, and the counter-intelligence staff was reduced from 300 to 80 people. In 1975, Angleton was awarded the CIA's Distinguished Intelligence Medal. By this time, Angleton had been quietly rehired by the CIA at his old salary through a secret contract. Until September 1975, "operational issues remained solely the preserve of Angleton."

Death
Angleton died from cancer in Washington D.C. on 11 May 1987.

Legacy

Angleton's tour of duty in Italy as an intelligence officer is regarded as a critical turn not only in his professional life, wherein he helped recover Nazi looted treasures from other European countries and Africa, but also for the Agency. Angleton's personal liaisons with Italian Mafia figures helped the CIA in the immediate period after World War II. Angleton took charge of the CIA's effort to subvert Italian elections, to prevent communist and communist-related parties from gaining political leverage in the parliament.

In time, Angleton's zeal and suspicions came to be regarded as counter-productive, if not destructive, for the CIA. In the wake of his departure, counter-intelligence efforts were undertaken with far less enthusiasm. Some believe this overcompensation was responsible for oversights which allowed Aldrich Ames, Robert Hanssen and many others to compromise the CIA, the FBI and other agencies long after Angleton's resignation. Although the American intelligence community quickly bounced back from the embarrassments of the Church Committee, it found itself uncharacteristically incapable of policing itself after Angleton's departure.

Edward Jay Epstein is among those who have argued that the positions of Ames and Hanssen—both well-placed Soviet counter-intelligence agents, in the CIA and FBI respectively—would enable the KGB to deceive the American intelligence community, in the manner that Angleton hypothesized.

The 1970s were generally a period of upheaval for the CIA. During George H. W. Bush's tenure as DCI, President Ford authorized the creation of a "Team B" under the aegis of the President's Foreign Intelligence Advisory Board. This project concluded that the Agency and the intelligence community had seriously underestimated Soviet strategic nuclear strength in Central Europe in their National Intelligence Estimate. The Church Commission brought no small number of skeletons out of the Agency's closet. The organization inherited by Admiral Stansfield Turner on his appointment as DCI by President Jimmy Carter in 1977, was shortly to face further cuts, and Turner used Angleton as an example of the excesses in the Agency that he hoped to curb, both during his service and in his memoirs.

The suspicions of Angleton and his staff impeded the career advancement of a number of CIA employees. The CIA later paid out compensation to three, under what Agency employees termed the "Mole Relief Act". Forty employees are said to have been investigated and fourteen considered serious suspects by Angleton's staff.

When Golitsyn defected, he claimed that the CIA had a mole who had been stationed in West Germany, was of Slavic descent, had a last name that might end in "sky" and definitely began with a "K", and operated under the KGB codename "Sasha". Angleton believed this claim, with the result that anyone who approximated this description fell under his suspicion. Some within CIA considered Golitsyn discredited even before Angleton's ousting, but the two did not appear to have lost their faith in one another. They sought the assistance of William F. Buckley, Jr. (himself once in the CIA) in authoring New Lies for Old, which advanced the argument that the USSR planned to fake its collapse to lull its enemies into a false sense of victory, but Buckley refused. In his book Wedge: The Secret War between the FBI and CIA (Knopf, 1994), Mark Riebling stated that of 194 predictions made in New Lies For Old, 139 had been fulfilled by 1993, nine seemed 'clearly wrong', and the other 46 were 'not soon falsifiable'.

Despite misgivings over his uncompromising and often obsessive approach to his profession, Angleton is highly regarded by a number of his peers in the intelligence business. Former Shin Bet chief Amos Manor, in an interview in Ha'aretz, revealed his fascination with the man during Angleton's work to forge the U.S.–Israel liaison in the early 1950s. Manor described Angleton as "fanatic about everything", with a "tendency towards mystification". Manor discovered decades later that the real reason for Angleton's visit to him was to investigate Manor, being an Eastern European Jewish immigrant, for James Angleton thought that it would be prudent to "sanitize" the U.S.–Israeli bridge before a more formal intelligence relationship was established.

CIA Family Jewels

A set of highly sensitive Agency documents, referred to as the "Family Jewels," was publicly released on June 25, 2007, after more than three decades of secrecy. The release was prompted by an internal CIA investigation of the 1970s Church Committee which verified the far-ranging power and influence that Angleton wielded during his long tenure as counter-intelligence czar. The exposé revealed that Angleton-planned infiltration of law enforcement and military organizations in other countries was used to increase the influence of the United States. It also confirmed past rumors that it was Angleton who was in charge of the domestic spying activities of the CIA under Operation CHAOS.

In popular culture
 The 2006 film The Good Shepherd is loosely based on Angleton's life and his role in the formation of the CIA.
 The Laundry Files by Charles Stross features a senior Laundry agent whose nom de guerre is James Angleton after the CIA chief.
 The 2007 television mini-series The Company focus on Angleton's efforts to find a Soviet mole.  Angleton was portrayed by Michael Keaton.
 Angleton was portrayed by John Light in the 2003 BBC TV mini-series Cambridge Spies.
 The song "Angleton" by Russian indie rock band Biting Elbows is about Angleton's life and career.
 In the television series Granite Flats the actor Cary Elwes plays Hugh Ashmead, the name "Ashmead" being the cover name for James J. Angleton.
 William F. Buckley's 2000 novel Spytime: The Undoing of James Jesus Angleton is a fictionalized treatment of Angleton's career, a storyline being placed upon, between and within actual historic facts and events.
 Mike Doughty released a song entitled "James Jesus Angleton" on Apple Music in December 2017.
 The Fatima Mansions track "Brunceling's song" mentions James Jesus Angleton by name, in a narrative involving spooks adapting to regular life.
 In the 1991 novel Harlot's Ghost, Tremont Montague (Harlot) is based on Angleton.
The fourth season of the television series Le Bureau des Légendes introduces a character from the French external security service (DGSE) with the nickname of "JJA" - James Jesus Angleton. There is a short discussion of Angleton's career and its connection to this character.
 Angleton was portrayed by Stephen Kunken in the 2022 ITVX mini-series A Spy Among Friends about the defection of Kim Philby.

See also
 Anti-communism
 David Blee
 Aleksander Kopatzky
 Joseph McCarthy
 Martel affair
 Sasha (espionage)
 Jim Skardon
 Spymaster

Notes

References
 Buckley, William F., Jr. Spytime: the Undoing of James Jesus Angleton: A Novel. New York: Harcourt, 2000. .
 Engelberg, Stephen. ”James Angleton, Counterintelligence Figure, Dies”. The New York Times, May 12, 1987,  p. D31
 Epstein, Edward Jay. Deception: The Invisible War between the CIA and the KGB. New York: Simon and Schuster, 1989. .
 Hersh, Seymour. "Huge C.I.A. Operation Reported in US against Antiwar Forces, Other Dissidents During Nixon Years." New York Times, December 22, 1974, p. 1.
 Hersh, Seymour. "President Tells Colby to Speed Report on CIA." New York Times, December 24, 1974, p. 43.
 Hersh, Seymour. "3 More Aides Quit in CIA Shake-Up." New York Times, December 30, 1974, p. 51.
 Hersh, Seymour. "The Angleton Story." New York Times Magazine, June 25, 1978, pp. SM4+.
 Holzman, Michael.  "James Jesus Angleton, The CIA and the Craft of Counter Intelligence. Amherst: The University of Massachusetts Press, 2008.. 
 Latham, Aaron. Orchids for Mother: A Novel. New York: Bantam Books, 1985. . Fictional account of Angleton.
 Littell, Robert. The Company: A Novel of the CIA. New York: Penguin Books, 2003. . Fictional history of the CIA during the Cold War in which Angleton is a major supporting character.
 Mangold, Tom. Cold Warrior: James Jesus Angleton: The CIA's Master Spy Hunter. New York: Simon and Schuster, 1991. .
 Martin, David C. Wilderness of Mirrors: Intrigue, Deception, and the Secrets that Destroyed Two of the Cold War's Most Important Agents. New York: Harper & Row, 1980; Boston: The Lyons Press, 2003 (reprinted). .
 Morley, Jefferson. The Ghost: The Secret Life of CIA Spymaster James Jesus Angleton. New York:  St. Martin's Press, 2017. . Full biography.
 Petit, Chris. The Passenger. London: Simon & Schuster, 2006. . A thriller/spy-novel which involves Angleton as a central character.
 
 Wise, David. Molehunt: The Secret Search for Traitors that Shattered the CIA. New York: Random House, 1992. .

External links

 
 Frontline – "The Spy Hunter" May 14, 1991 by Tom Mangold for the PBS program

1917 births
1987 deaths
American Cold War spymasters
United States Army personnel of World War II
American people of Mexican descent
American spies
Burials in Idaho
Cold War CIA chiefs
Counterintelligence analysts
Deaths from cancer in Washington, D.C.
Harvard Law School alumni
Knights of Malta
Military personnel from Idaho
People educated at Malvern College
People from Boise, Idaho
People of the Central Intelligence Agency
People of the Office of Strategic Services
Recipients of the Distinguished Intelligence Medal
United States Army soldiers
World War II espionage
Yale University alumni